Sutton is a village and civil parish in the District of Chichester in West Sussex, England, located six kilometres (4 miles) south of Petworth and east of the A285 road.
The parish has a land area of 920 hectares (2272 acres). In the 2001 census 192 people lived in 83 households, of whom 83 were economically active. The 2011 Census population included the village of Barlavington and hamlet of Codmore Hill.

The village has an Anglican church, St John the Baptist, and one pub, the White Horse.

Landmarks
Lords Piece at Coates is a Site of Special Scientific Interest within the parish which at one time contained the entire known remaining British population of the field cricket Gryllus campestris. Coates Castle is within the neighbouring parish of Fittleworth.

Notable people

 Sir Gerald Barry a British newspaper editor and organiser of the Festival of Britain, lived at Forge House, which was remodelled for him by F. R. S. Yorke in 1937.

References

External links

Chichester District
Villages in West Sussex